Alvin E. Roth (born 1951) is an American academic and Nobel Laureate in Economics.

Alvin Roth may also refer to:

Alvin Roth (basketball), American basketball player
Alvin Roth (bridge) (1914–2007), American bridge player